Working Men's Club is the debut album by the Yorkshire synthpop band Working Men's Club, released on 2 October 2020 on Heavenly Recordings.

Critical reception 
Working Men's Club was met with critical acclaim. At Metacritic, which assigns a normalized rating out of 100 to reviews from mainstream publications, the album received an average score of 83, which indicates "universal acclaim", based on 10 reviews. The record also received an average score of 8.1 from AnyDecentMusic?, a normalized rating out of 10.

Clash critic Josh Crowe described the record as something that "could pass as a mixtape, traversing through a medley of sounds, eras and genres", stating that "the one thing consistent throughout are the standout vocals of Minsky-Sargeant." Dave Simpson of The Guardian wrote: "The West Yorkshire band take the stark electronics of the post-punk scene and warm them with Detroit techno and Italian house – while addressing Andrew Neil with mischievous one-liners."

Ali Shutler of NME was positive about the album, writing, "a world away from their early work, the Todmorden group find chaos in the every day on their superb debut."

Tim Russell of God Is in the TV was also positive, calling Working Men's Club "a very special record, inspired by a fairly specific past but managing to sound fresh, contemporary and original, due in no small part to the precocious talent and charisma of singer Syd Minsky-Sargeant, a true star in the making."

Accolades

Track listing

References

2020 debut albums